Interstate 190 (I-190) is an auxiliary Interstate Highway in the US state of South Dakota. The route runs for about  connecting I-90 to downtown Rapid City. Its length from I-90 to Omaha Street runs concurrent with US Highway 16 (US 16).

Route description

I-190 begins as West Boulevard and has an intersection with Omaha Street, which is signed as US 16/South Dakota Highway 44 (SD 44). US 16 westbound goes east on Omaha Street and eastbound runs north concurrently with I-190. I-190 then becomes a freeway, with an exit to North Street. I-190 then passes under Anamosa Street before an onramp from the northbound lanes of West Boulevard. Both US 16 and I-190 then terminate at a trumpet interchange with I-90/US 14/SD 79.

State law
Legally, the route of I-190 is defined at South Dakota Codified Laws § 31-4-203.

History

A freeway replacing West Bypass to connect downtown Rapid City to I-90 was proposed by the city government. The designation of I-190 for this connector was approved by the American Association of State Highway Officials in November 1958.

I-190 was opened in 1962 to connect Rapid City to the recently completed I-90 bypass, which was built outside of Rapid City's northern boundaries.

The interchange with I-90 was rebuilt from 2000 to 2001, changing from a directional T interchange with a left exit to a trumpet interchange. The Omaha Street intersection was rebuilt in 2004, while the North Street interchange was converted to a single-point urban interchange in 2017.

Exit list 
All exit numbers start with 1. Exits are lettered.

References

90-1 South Dakota
90-1
1 (South Dakota)
Transportation in Rapid City, South Dakota
Interstate 190
1962 establishments in South Dakota